Asigliano Veneto is a town and comune in the province of Vicenza, Veneto, Italy.

Demographics
In 2001, Asigliano Veneto had a population of 860 and 281 families living in the town.

Sources
(Google Maps)
Census of 2001

References

Cities and towns in Veneto